The Museum of Ancient Iran is the first Iranian museum and is located at the western part of Mashhq Square in Tehran. A French architect, named André Godard, started the construction of the museum on May 11, 1934 by the order of Reza Shah. The museum building was completed in 1937 and then was opened for first public visits.
The land allocated to this museum is 5,500 square meters, of which 2,744 square meters is used for the foundation of the museum.

The building
Since the design of a museum should be relevant to its theme and the objects inside it, as well as being linked to the history and the art of that land, therefore, the facade and the entrance of the museum were both made in the same style of Taq Kasra. Taq Kasra was a palace in Ctesiphon, the capital of the Sasanian Empire. The porch to the palace is 35 meters tall, 50 meters wide and 25 meters deep. Bricks used are dark red to reflect the Sasanian architecture. The museum is about 11,000 square meters, with its main building built in three floors.

The architects of this building, Andre Godard, along with Maxim Sirow, were French architects whose designs were inspired from the Palace of Kasra in the city of  Ctesiphon of the Sasanian  era.

The construction of the museum was started in the year 1934 and was completed within two years by Haj Abbasali Memar and Professor Morad Tabrizi. It was officially opened in 1937. Primarily, the first floor of the museum was dedicated to pre-Islamic history of Iran and the second floor to the post-Islamic era.

The development of archaeological excavations and the increasing accumulation of works in the Museum of Ancient Iran caused the museum to be in several stages, quantitative and qualitative expansion between the years 1979 to 1991, in addition to replacing museum displays, modernizing the heating system and the electrical system of the museum. Also the warehouse and treasures were built and added to the museum.

In 1996, the works of the Islamic era were officially separated from the Museum of Ancient Iran and moved to the adjacent building, which had been built in 1958.

This building was originally intended to be an anthropology museum. But after Iranian revolution, with the establishment of the Cultural Heritage Organization and the concentration of ancient objects in the Museum of Ancient Iran, it was suggested that the museum be renamed   to the National Museum of Iran and another museum named Museum of the Islamic Art be added to it. Eventually, in 1996, with the official opening of the Islamic Museum, the whole complex of the Museum of Ancient Iran and the Museum of the Islamic Era was officially named as the National Museum of Iran.

Features
The oldest part of the museum, built by hand is made of quartz stones found in the basin of the river Kashaf Rud east of the city of Mashhad. The stones are more than a million years old. In this section, you will also find a treasure trove of Gilan province also of near Mahabad, which goes back to 200 to 700 thousand years ago. From middle Paleolithic period, which coincides with the emergence of Neanderthal human in Iran, also remains of interesting tools made of pyrite or remains of animal fossil fountains, found in caves in Zagros Mountains and central Iranian Plateau like the caves of Bisotun and Khorramabad which are put on show in the museum.

In the New Paleolithic period, which corresponds with the expansion of modern human intelligence in Iran, the construction of a blade of tools became common place. The oldest human remains discovered in Iran are seen in this section, which is known for its tooth. This tooth is the oldest remains of human fossils in Iran, which has been directly narrated and discovered in a cave, near Kermanshah, called Wazma. This small Asian tooth, which is related to a nine-year-old child, belonged to 20–25 thousand years ago was discovered by gamma-ray spectroscopy.

In the new Paleolithic period, making bone tools and using personalized decorations such as pillow pendants, animal teeth, and flowers were also common in Iran. One of the most important places of this period is the cave named Yafteh in Lorestan province which displays many of these objects in the museum hall. Some examples of hybrid instruments, the application of stratification, and the preservation of foodstuffs from the Ali Tappeh cave in Mazandaran and Shalom cave in Ilam which are associated to the Metamorphosed Rock period can also be seen in the museum.

From the Neolithic and Romanesque art, works such as the oldest Iranian clay from the Gange Darre Hill, the oldest human and animal mud samples from the Sarab Hill, and some stone tools are shown in the hall... Shoush (Khuzestan), Ismail-Abad and Cheshmeh Ali (Tehran), Taleyakon (Fars) from the most important sites in the 5th and 4th millennium BC. (Copper and stones) in Iran, with samples of their pottery are painted and seen in the hall. Interesting patterns of this period can be seen in the simplified pattern of mountain goats, which are seen at the level of pottery of Ismail-Abad and Cheshmeh Ali.

Vessels of Jiroft and Shahdad with diverse designs such as the battle of man with mythological beasts and the pattern of geometric, animal and plant elements are typical examples of these vessels displayed in showcases. Another important work of this period in the museum is the flower of Shahdad, which shows the naked man with his hands on the chest, probably in prayer mode. Containers, war devices, decorative objects, human and animal buildings, including the metal objects of the late Bronze Age and the beginning of the Iron Age, are shown in the hall.

A number of objects displayed in the prehistoric art section of the hall belong to the Ilam civilization.

Of all the periods in Ilam, many works of art have survived, but the middle era of Ilam, is known as one of the most beautiful trials of the Ilamis. Chogha Zanbil. Temple is one of the most important architectural remnants of this period, with remarkable works such as cow's statue with inscriptions, glass tubes, bricks and clones on it, are featured in the hall.

The works in the museum hall attributable to the Medes era are from the ancient places of Nowshajan, Hasanlu, Godin, and Babajan. During this era, the construction of iron objects expanded, including the objects of Hasanlu, which is one of the most prominent examples in the hall. Also a beautiful glazed pottery was created, a spectacular example of which is the glaze of Zivia, showing two goats on the two sides of a Lotus flower.

Gallery

References

1934 establishments in Iran
Museums established in 1934
Cultural infrastructure completed in 1937
Museums in Tehran
History museums in Iran
Archaeological museums in Iran